Löve is a surname derived from "Lion". Notable peiople with the name include: 

 Áskell Löve (1916–1994), Icelandic systematic botanist
 Doris Löve (1918–2000), Swedish systematic botanist
 Þorsteinn Löve (1923 – 2002), Icelandic athlete

See also 

 Løve, a surname
 Love (disambiguation)

Icelandic-language surnames